Philip George Dorrell (6 December 1914 — 8 November 1994) was an English cricketer who played a single first-class match, for Worcestershire against Northamptonshire in 1946. He scored 1 in his only inning.

Dorrell was born in Worcester; he also died there, aged 79.

External links
 

1914 births
1994 deaths
English cricketers
Worcestershire cricketers
Sportspeople from Worcester, England
Philip